Helge Brendryen (born February 17, 1974) is a Norwegian former ski jumper who competed from 1993 to 1995. He won a gold medal in the team large hill at the 1993 FIS Nordic World Ski Championships and finished fifth in the individual large hill at those same championships.

His best non-world championship finish was eighth in a flying hill competition in Austria in 1993.

External links 
 

1974 births
Living people
Norwegian male ski jumpers
FIS Nordic World Ski Championships medalists in ski jumping
20th-century Norwegian people